Bone china is a type of ceramic that is composed of bone ash, feldspathic material, and kaolin. It has been defined as "ware with a translucent body" containing a minimum of 30% of phosphate derived from animal bone and calculated calcium phosphate. Bone china is the strongest of the porcelain or china ceramics, having very high mechanical and physical strength and chip resistance, and is known for its high levels of whiteness and translucency. Its high strength allows it to be produced in thinner cross-sections than other types of porcelain. Like stoneware, it is vitrified, but is translucent due to differing mineral properties.

In the mid-18th century, English potters had not succeeded in making hard-paste porcelain (as made in East Asia and Meissen porcelain), but found bone ash a useful addition to their soft-paste porcelain mixtures, giving strength.  This became standard at the Bow porcelain factory in London (operating from around 1747), and spread to some other English factories.  The modern product was developed by the Staffordshire potter Josiah Spode in the early 1790s.  Spode included kaolin, so his formula, sometimes called "Staffordshire bone-porcelain", was effectively hard-paste, but stronger, and versions were adopted by all the major English factories by around 1815.

From its initial development and up to the latter part of the 20th century, bone china was almost exclusively an English product, with production being effectively localised in Stoke-on-Trent. Most major English firms made or still make it, including  Spode, and Worcester, Royal Crown Derby, Royal Doulton, Wedgwood, and Mintons.   In the 20th century it began to be made elsewhere, including in Russia, China, and Japan. China is now the world's largest manufacturer.

In the UK, references to "china" or "porcelain" can refer to bone china, and "English porcelain" has been used as a term for it, both in the UK and around the world.

History 
The first development of what would become known as bone china was made by Thomas Frye at his Bow porcelain factory near Bow in East London in 1748. His factory was located very close to the cattle markets and slaughterhouses of London and Essex, and hence easy access to animal bones. Frye used up to 45% bone ash in his formulation to create what he called "fine porcelain".

Later, Josiah Spode in Stoke-on-Trent further developed the concept between 1789 and 1793, introducing his "Stoke China" in 1796.  He died suddenly the year later, and his son Josiah II quickly rechristened the ware "Bone china". Among his developments was to abandon Frye's procedure of calcining the bone together with some of the other raw body materials, instead calcining just the bone. Bone china quickly proved to be highly popular, leading to its production by other English pottery manufacturers. Both Spode's formulation and his business were successful: his formulation of 6 parts bone ash, 4 parts china stone and 3.5 parts china clay, remains the basis for all bone china. It was only in 2009 that his company, Spode, went into receivership before eventually being purchased by Portmeirion.

Production

Raw materials

The traditional formulation for bone china is about 25% kaolin, 25% Cornish stone and 50% bone ash.

The bone ash that is used in bone china has traditionally been made from cattle bones that have a lower iron content. These bones are crushed before being degelatinised and then calcined to around 1,000 °C to produce bone ash. The ash is milled to a fine particle size. The kaolin component of the body is needed to give the unfired body plasticity which allows articles to be shaped. This mixture is then fired at around 1200 °C. The raw materials for bone china are comparatively expensive, and the production is labour-intensive, which is why bone china maintains a luxury status and high pricing.

The use of hydroxyapatite compounds, derived from rock sources, rather than bone ash has seen increased use since the 1990s. If used appropriately the resultant ceramic material conforms to accepted defintions of bone china, and the properties and appearance are indistinguishable from those using naturally derived bone ash.

Mineralogy 
Bone china consists of two crystalline phases, anorthite (CaAl2Si2O8) and β-tricalcium phosphate/whitlockite (Ca3(PO4)2) embedded in a substantial amount of glass.

Production locations 
For almost 200 years from its development bone china was almost exclusively produced in the UK. During the middle part of the 20th century manufacturers in other countries began production, with the first successful ones outside the UK being in Japan: Noritake, Nikko and Narumi.

In more recent years production in China has expanded considerably, and the country is now the biggest producer of bone china in the world. Other countries producing considerable amounts of bone china are Bangladesh, India, Indonesia, Iran, Sri Lanka and Thailand.

From the start of the first factory, Bengal Potteries, in 1964, bone china output from Indian factories had risen to 10,000 tonnes per year by 2009. Rajasthan has become a hub for bone china in India, with production in the state totalling 16-17 tonnes per day in 2003.

Lenox was the only major manufacturer of bone china in the United States, and has supplied presidential services to the White House. It closed production in the US permanently in March 2020.

Cultural issues
In the 21st century, "Islamic bone china" became available, using only bone ash from halal animals.  

Due to the use of animal bones in the production of bone china vegetarians and vegans may avoid using or purchasing it.

References

External links
 

Ceramic materials
Porcelain
Pottery